Karl Wondrak (6 September 1895 – 27 April 1973) was an Austrian footballer.

References

External links
 Rapid Archiv 

1895 births
1973 deaths
Austrian footballers
Austria international footballers
Association football forwards
SK Rapid Wien players
Austrian football managers
Wiener Sport-Club managers